Mallaig High School is a secondary school in Mallaig, Lochaber,  Scotland. The school building opened in 1989. The current head teacher is  Jeremy Newnham who was appointed in 2020.
Its associated primary schools are Arisaig Primary, Eigg Primary, Inverie Primary, Lady Lovat Primary, Mallaig Primary, Muck Primary, Rum Primary and Canna Primary. Next to the school is a leisure centre.

References

1989 establishments in Scotland
Educational institutions established in 1989
Mallaig
School buildings completed in 1989
Secondary schools in Highland (council area)